Wyoming Highway 272 (WYO 272) is a  north–south Wyoming State Road named North Lance Creek Road and is located in north central Niobrara County.

Route description
Wyoming Highway 272 has its southern end at Wyoming Highway 270, northeast of Lance Creek. WYO 272 heads north into the Lance Creek Fossil Area. Highway 272 ends at 3.32 miles and Niobrara County Route 14 takes over as the northern routing.

Major intersections

References

Official 2003 State Highway Map of Wyoming

External links 

Wyoming State Routes 200-299
WYO 272 - WYO 270 to N. Lance Creek Road/CR 14

Transportation in Niobrara County, Wyoming
272